The Joint Declaration on the Question of Macau, or Sino-Portuguese Joint Declaration, was a treaty between Portugal and the People's Republic of China over the status of Macau. The full name of the treaty is Joint Declaration of the Government of the People's Republic of China and the Government of the Portuguese Republic on the question of Macao. Signed on 26 March 1987 the Declaration established the process and conditions of the transfer of the territory from Portuguese rule to the People's Republic of China. The Joint Declaration served also as the main source of fundamental rights that were implemented in the Macau Special Administrative Region Basic Law.  The process was otherwise similar to the handover of Hong Kong to Chinese sovereignty by the United Kingdom in 1997.

Background
By the 17th century, Portugal had established colonial rule over Macau after gaining concessions from various Chinese governments. In 1887, Portugal and the Qing dynasty signed the Sino-Portuguese Draft Minutes and the Sino–Portuguese Treaty of Peking, in which China ceded to Portugal the right to "perpetual occupation and government of Macau"; conversely, Portugal pledged to seek China's approval before transferring Macau to another country. Colonial rule continued until 1974, when the Carnation revolution installed a democratic regime in Portugal that sought to end colonialism. Bilateral talks between China and Portugal led to the status of Macau being established as Chinese territory under Portuguese administration. The full framework of transfer of sovereignty was decided in 1987 with the Sino-Portuguese Joint Declaration.

Provisions
The declaration provided for Portuguese administration to officially end on 20 December 1999. Although it would become a full part of the People's Republic of China, Macau would enjoy the status of a Special Administrative Region (SAR), with full autonomy and self-governance in domestic affairs, economic policy and internal security. The system of "One country, two systems" would be established, exempting Macau from the socialist system and several laws decreed by the central government in Beijing. The capitalist, legal system and liberal society enjoyed by Macau would remain unchanged for a minimum of 50 years after the transfer. The Chinese government would not levy taxes on Macau nor make laws pertaining to Macau's governance. The Macau SAR would enjoy a great degree of autonomy in all but foreign affairs and defence, which would remain under Chinese control. Bearing the name of "Macau, China," Macau would enjoy the right to conclude agreements and arrangements with Portugal and international organisations for its own development. The Chinese National People's Congress would enact a "Basic Law" that would formalise the respecting of some basic principles of Chinese government in Macau, but leaving other areas untouched.

See also
China–Portugal relations
History of Macau
One Country, Two Systems
Sino-British Joint Declaration, a similar treaty on the status of Hong Kong

References

Cold War treaties
History of Macau
Politics of Macau
Treaties of the People's Republic of China
1987 in Portugal
1987 in China
1987 in Macau
Treaties involving territorial changes
Treaties concluded in 1987
Treaties entered into force in 1999
Treaties of Portugal
Portuguese Macau
China–Portugal relations
National questions